The Pakistan Hockey Federation is the governing body for the sport of field hockey in Pakistan. It is affiliated with the International Hockey Federation (FIH).

Management positions
The current Patron-in-Chief is Prime Minister Mian Muhammad Shahbaz Sharif. Federation's President is Khalid S. Khokhar, Secretary General is Syed Haider Hussain and treasurer is Shahid Pervaiz Bhandara

PHF Executive Board members are Mohamad Saeed Khan, Maj.Gen (R) Tariq Haleem Suri, HI (M), Amjad Pervaiz Satti, while Office Management Director Administration & Coordination is Javeed Arshad Khan Manj, Raja Ghazanfar Ali - office Secretary, Muhammad Nadeem- Assistant Office Secretary, Saleem Gill - Accounts Manager

History

The game of field hockey was originally brought to Pakistan during the British Raj, and like cricket, became a popular sport among the local population. The Pakistan Hockey Federation came into being in 1948, following the independence of Pakistan in 1947.  Prior to this, players from what is now Pakistan had competed internationally alongside players from what is now India. In the beginning, the Federation's membership included the provincial hockey federations of Punjab, Sindh, Balochistan, Khyber-Pakhtunkhwa, Bahawalpur, East Bengal, and the Pakistani Armed Forces Sports Board.

Pakistan played their first international game in London when they defeated Belgium 2-1 at the 14th Olympic Games on 2 August 1948. The first President of PHF was Ghazanfar Ali Khan, with Baseer Ali Sheikh as the Honorary Secretary. The Pakistan national side soon established a strong reputation in international competition, helping to maintain interest in the game in Pakistan which assisted the growth of the Federation. However, no full-time central office or secretariat, as such, was established until the 1960s. The office of the Pakistan Hockey Federation, located at the National Hockey Stadium was developed into a secretariat in 1971. It was during the second term as president of Air Marshal Nur Khan from 1978 that Pakistani hockey entered a golden age. National senior, national Junior and women hockey teams were all competing internationally. On the personal initiative of Air Marshal M. Nur Khan, the FIH introduced the World Cup and the Champions Trophy, which are now rated among field hockey's major international tournaments alongside the Olympics.

However, the 1976 Olympics in Montreal had seen the introduction of artificial turf to international hockey competition. Pakistan was unable to build many artificial turf pitches compared to the European sides, and thus the strength of the national side began declining slowly.

Pakistan Hockey Super League 

In February 2016, the Pakistan Hockey Federation initiated preparations for a domestic hockey league, to be played from October to November 2016, according to then Secretary Shahbaz Ahmed Senior. The former Olympian believed the development and growth of young Pakistani hockey players would rely on the success of the league, and this would help Pakistan regain its historic aura as a hockey-playing nation.

An autonomous board for the league was established in 2016. PHF President Khalid Sajjad Khokhar mentioned that the league would be sanctioned by the International Hockey Federation (FIH), adding that the PHF was in touch with the world hockey governing body to avoid any clashes with international events. The league was postponed after the government of Punjab refused to give an NOC to host the event in 2016.

In December 2017, it was announced that the Pakistan Hockey Super League - The Max was given an NOC. The inaugural season was slated to begin in April 2018, but was postponed to July 2018 due to the national team's participation in the 2018 Commonwealth Games, and the forthcoming month of Ramadan.

On 11 January 2022, the Pakistan Hockey Federation formally inaugurated the Pakistan Hockey Super League "THE MAX".

Affiliated associations
 Azad Jammu and Kashmir Hockey Association 
 Balochistan Hockey Association
 Federally Administered Tribal Areas Hockey Association 
 Gilgit-Baltistan Hockey Association 
 Islamabad Hockey Association
 Khyber Pakhtunkhwa Hockey Association
 Punjab Hockey Association
 Sindh Hockey Association

Presidents
The following is a list of the Presidents of PHF:

Secretaries
The following is a list of the Secretaries General of PHF:

See also
Pakistan Hockey League
International Tournaments (field hockey)

References

External links

 
Pakistan
Hockey
Field hockey in Pakistan
Non-profit organisations based in Pakistan
Sports organizations established in 1948
Field hockey governing bodies in Asia
1948 establishments in Pakistan